Am Ettersberg is a municipality in the district Weimarer Land, in Thuringia, Germany. It was created with effect from 1 January 2019 by the merger of the former municipalities of Berlstedt, Buttelstedt, Großobringen, Heichelheim, Kleinobringen, Krautheim, Ramsla, Sachsenhausen, Schwerstedt, Vippachedelhausen and Wohlsborn. The name refers to the hill Ettersberg.

References

Weimarer Land